Deadly Sins may refer to:
Seven deadly sins, Christian classification of vices
Deadly Sins (album), 2007 Seven Witches album
Deadly Sins (film), 1995 American slasher film
Deadly Sins (TV series), American TV series, 2012 debut

See also
Seven deadly sins (disambiguation)